Fouchécourt may refer to:
Fouchécourt, Haute-Saône, a commune in the French region of Franch-Comté
Fouchécourt, Vosges, a commune in the French region of Lorraine